Adrienne Martine-Barnes (19 January 1942 – 20 July 2015), was an American contemporary, non-fiction and fantasy writer.

Biography
Martine-Barnes was born Adrienne Zinah Martinez in Los Angeles in 1942. While in school she wrote two one-act plays which were produced. She attended the University of Redlands and UCLA but did not graduate. In 1964, she married Ronald Hicks, with whom she had one son, Geoffrey. They divorced in 1968.

Martine-Barnes moved to New York city and became an agent. She was a member of the Society for Creative Anachronism while living there. In 1972, she married Larry Barnes. Barnes later vanished while camping in California was presumed dead by authorities.

She did not write her first novel, Never Speak of Love, until 1982. Many of her novels were based in fantasy and mythology. She also wrote with both Diana Paxson and Marion Zimmer Bradley. She was a member of the Science Fiction Writers of America.

She died in 2015 in Oregon and was buried in Kingman, Indiana.

Bibliography

Novels

 Never Speak of Love (1982)

Chronicles of Fionn mac Cumhal

 Master of Earth and Water (1993) with Diana L. Paxson
 The Shield Between the Worlds (1994) with Diana L. Paxson
 Sword of Fire and Shadow (1995) with Diana L. Paxson

Chronique D'Avebury

 The Fire Sword (1984)
 The Crystal Sword (1988)
 The Rainbow Sword (1988)
 The Sea Sword (1989)

Darkover

 Exile's Song (1996) with Marion Zimmer Bradley
 The Shadow Matrix (1997) with Marion Zimmer Bradley
 Traitor's Sun (1999) with Marion Zimmer Bradley

Dragon Rises

 The Dragon Rises (1983)

Short fiction

Di Catenas (1982)
Wildwood (1983)
War Corsets of the Gore (1992)
The Elements So Mixed (1994)
People and Places (1994) with Diana L. Paxson
Flambeaux (1995)
The Wolf Creek Fragment (1995)
Winter Tales (1996)
The Naming of Names (1997)

References and sources

1942 births
2015 deaths
American women novelists
20th-century American novelists
American women short story writers
20th-century American short story writers
American science fiction writers
Women science fiction and fantasy writers
Writers from Los Angeles
Novelists from California
20th-century American women writers
21st-century American women